The 2001 Swisscom Challenge was a women's tennis tournament played on indoor carpet courts. It was the 18th edition of the event and was part of the Tier I Series of the 2001 WTA Tour. It took place at the Schluefweg in Zürich, Switzerland, from 14 through 21 October 2001. Lindsay Davenport won the singles title.

Points and prize money

Point distribution

Prize money

* per team

Singles main draw entrants

Seeds

1 Rankings as of 8 October 2001.

Other entrants
The following players received wildcards into the singles main draw:
  Lina Krasnoroutskaya
  Nadia Petrova
  Patty Schnyder

The following players received entry from the qualifying draw:
  Daniela Hantuchová
  Iva Majoli
  Marie-Gaïané Mikaelian
  Tatiana Panova

The following players received entry as lucky losers:
  Janette Husárová
  Alexandra Stevenson

Withdrawals
Before the tournament
  Martina Hingis (ankle injury)

Doubles main draw entrants

Seeds

1 Rankings as of 8 October 2001.

Other entrants

The following pair received wildcards into the doubles main draw:
  Elena Dementieva /  Lina Krasnoroutskaya

The following pair received entry from the qualifying draw:
  Åsa Carlsson /  María Emilia Salerni

The following pair received entry as lucky losers:
  Nadia Petrova /  Iroda Tulyaganova

Withdrawals
Before the tournament
  Martina Hingis (ankle injury) → replaced by Petrova/Tulyaganova

Finals

Singles

  Lindsay Davenport defeated  Jelena Dokic, 6–3, 6–1
It was the 6th title of the year for Davenport and the 36th title in her singles career.

Doubles

  Lindsay Davenport /  Lisa Raymond defeated  Sandrine Testud /  Roberta Vinci, 6–3, 2–6, 6–2
It was the 31st title for Davenport and the 26th title for Raymond in their respective doubles careers. It was also the 2nd title for the pair during the season.

References

External links
 Official results archive (ITF)
 Official results archive (WTA)

Swisscom Challenge
2001
2001 in Swiss tennis
2001 in Swiss women's sport